Bobbi Gichard (born 29 November 1999) is a New Zealand swimmer. She competed in the women's 200 metre backstroke event at the 2017 World Aquatics Championships. She also competed at the 2018 Commonwealth Games in the 100 metre backstroke and 200 metre backstroke and was the lead-off swimmer for the New Zealand team which finish sixth in the final of 4 × 100 metre medley relay.

References

1999 births
Living people
New Zealand female swimmers
Swimmers at the 2014 Summer Youth Olympics
Swimmers at the 2018 Commonwealth Games
Commonwealth Games competitors for New Zealand